The Cuba women's national under-23 volleyball team represents Cuba in women's under-23 volleyball events, it is controlled and managed by the Cuban Volleyball Federation that is a member of North American volleyball body North, Central America and Caribbean Volleyball Confederation (NORCECA) and the international volleyball body government the Fédération Internationale de Volleyball (FIVB).

Results

FIVB U23 World Championship
 Champions   Runners up   Third place   Fourth place

U23 Pan American Cup
 Champions   Runners up   Third place   Fourth place

Team

Current squad
The following is the Cuban roster in the 2017 FIVB Women's U23 World Championship.

Head coach: Wilfredo Robinson

Notable players

References

External links
FIVB profile

Volleyball
National women's under-23 volleyball teams
Volleyball in Cuba
Volleyball